This page details the process of the 2011 African Youth Championship qualification phase. The qualifiers consisted of three rounds of two legged matches. Some countries had a bye to the First Round. The winners of the Second Round matches qualified for the finals. South Africa entered the qualifiers as they were originally not the hosts.

Preliminary round
The first leg was played on either 16, 17 or 18 April 2010. The second leg was held on either 30 April, 1 or 2 May 2010. The winners advanced to the First Round.

Ghana, Cameroon, South Africa, Nigeria, Egypt, Rwanda, Mali, Ivory Coast, Benin, Gambia, Sudan, Zambia, Congo, Burkina Faso, Angola and Morocco all received byes to the First Round.

|}

First round
The First Round first leg matches were held on 23, 24 and 25 July 2010. The second leg matches were held on 6, 7 and 8 August 2010. The winners qualified for the Second Round.

|}

Second round
The Second Round first leg matches were played on 24 to 26 September 2010. The second leg matches were played on 22 to 24 October 2010.
The winners of the aggregate of the two legs qualified for the Finals.

|}

References

External links
Results by RSSSF

Qual
Qual
2011